The 2013 FIBA Europe Under-16 Championship for Women Division C was the 9th edition of the Division C of the FIBA U16 Women's European Championship, the third tier of the European women's under-16 basketball championship. It was played in Gibraltar from 2 to 7 July 2013. Cyprus women's national under-16 basketball team won the tournament.

Participating teams

Final standings

References

2013
2013–14 in European women's basketball
FIBA U16
Sports competitions in Gibraltar
FIBA